KIRC 105.9 FM is a radio station licensed to Seminole, Oklahoma, USA. The station broadcasts a country music format and is owned by One Ten Broadcast Group, Inc.

References

External links
KIRC's official website

IRC
Country radio stations in the United States